The 2001–02 Tulsa Golden Hurricane men's basketball team represented the University of Tulsa as a member of the Western Athletic Conference in the 2001–02 college basketball season. The Golden Hurricane played their home games at the Reynolds Center. Led by head coach John Phillips, they finished the season 27–7 overall and 15–3 in conference play to finish in a tie atop the WAC standings. The lost in the championship game of the 2002 WAC men's basketball tournament to earn an at-large bid to the NCAA tournament as No. 12 seed in the Midwest region. The Golden Hurricane upset No. 5 seed Marquette in the first round, before falling to Kentucky in the Round of 32.

Roster

Schedule and results

|-
!colspan=9 style=| Regular Season

|-
!colspan=9 style=| WAC Tournament

|-
!colspan=9 style=| NCAA Tournament

Rankings

References

Tulsa Golden Hurricane men's basketball seasons
Tulsa
Tulsa Golden Hurricane men's b
Tulsa Golden Hurricane men's b
Tulsa